T56 or T-56 may refer to:

 Allison T56, a turboprop aircraft engine
 Borg-Warner T-56, an automotive transmission
 Utility Vehicle, Tracked, Infantry, T56, an American armored personnel carrier prototype
 Type 56 assault rifle, a Chinese assault rifle derived from the AK-47. 
 Type 56 armored personnel carrier, a Chinese armored personnel carrier derived from the BTR-152